Luis Armando Roche (born November 21, 1938) was a Venezuelan film director, screenwriter, producer and director of theatre and opera. Roche born in Caracas, Venezuela. In 1999, he won the most important prize of cinema in his country. He lives in Caracas.

Early life 

Luis Armando Roche (born November 21, 1938) is a filmmaker, screenwriter and director of theatre and opera. His father was Luis Roche (1888–1965) urban planner and amateur photographer, creator of the Plaza Altamira (Caracas), and his mother was Beatrice Dugand (born 1898). The origin of families can be found in France (Roche and Dugand), Italy (Gnecco by the mother) and Ireland. The Irish family emigrated to France after the Battle of Limerick.

Primary Education 
Roche studied primary school in Caracas. In 1945 he moved to the Venezuelan Andes and studied 2 years at the San Jose School in Mérida. In 1947, his father was Ambassador of Venezuela in Argentina, so he studied at the French School of Buenos Aires. In 1949, Roche joined the Nyack Junior School, elementary school near New York. After two years enrolled at The Choate School, college preparatory school located in Wallingford (Connecticut), United States. In 1957, he finished his high school and studied one year at Tulane University New Orleans. Two years later, he returned to Caracas.

Second stage of studies and early work on cinema 
In 1961 Roche got married with Marion Cisneros. From his first marriage he has 4 children: Beatrice, Nadine, Alonso and Alvaro. In the early 1960s the couple moved to Europe and Roche began his Cinema studies. During 1962–1964 he studied at the Institute for Advanced Film Studies (IDHEC) in Paris, where he received the title of Director-Producer. During that time he made his first short film: Genevilliers, port of Paris (1964), a documentary focused on one port of Paris. A year later, he finished Raymond Isidore and His House (1965) a documentary about a "naif" builder in Chartres, France, who made his house with different pieces such as bottles, caps, glasses, etc. During his second year at the IDHEC Roche made the short film Let's To See Said a Blind Man To His Deaf Wife (1965). From that moment, Roche continued to study film at the University of California, Los Angeles and the University of Southern California.
In 1965, his father died and he back to Caracas.

Venezuela - National Cinematheque - Short and Medium Length Films 
Arriving at the capital of Venezuela he worked in ARS, an advertising agency. Roche was assistant to the writer Alejo Carpentier, and of Bob Ferber, head of public relations. At that time, the renowned Venezuelan filmmaker Margot Benacerraf gave to him the opportunity to be Director of the Audiovisual Department, Film, Theatre and Television at the National Institute of Culture (INCIBA). During those years, Roche was one of the founding members of the National Cinematheque: Fundación Cinemateca Nacional de Venezuela. Also wrote and directed for the INCIBA, scripts and short films: The feast of the Virgen de la Candelaria (1966) (La fiesta de la Virgen de La Candelaria) and The Devils of San Miguel (1966) (Los demonios de San Miguel). A year later, he co-wrote and directed with Jean-Jacques Bichier, the short film Víctor Millán (1967). In Paris, wrote and directed a medium-length titled Carlos Cruz Diez, 1923-1977. On The Road To color (1971) (Carlos Cruz Diez, 1923-1977. En el camino del color), this work was followed by Ignacio "Indio" Figueredo (1972), a short film about the great Venezuelan harpist; the same year made Merida is Not A Town (1972), (Mérida no es un pueblo), an experimental short film. Also he wrote and directed the medium-length Like Islands in Time (1975) (Como islas en el tiempo), about the Charles Brewer-Carias expedition to the tepuis Sarisariñama and Jaua, located in Amazonas (Venezuela). Also produced, wrote and directed Virtuosos (1999), about Venezuelan folk musicians of the 20th century. As well, he wrote with Diana Abreu Bach In Zaraza (2000), a short musical about an imaginary trip to Venezuela of Johann Sebastian Bach. At the same time, Roche worked as assistant director on many foreign films that were shot in Venezuela and Colombia: The Epic of Bolivar directed by Alessandro Blasetti; Popsy Pop - or La Belle et le Truand directed by Jean Herman and The Adventurers of Lewis Gilbert and Murphy's War made by Peter Yates.

Filmography 
In 1977, Roche made his first feature film, The Moving Picture Man (El cine soy yo). The film was co-wrote with Fabrice Helion. In this film Roche made his first performance as actor. The film was presented at international festivals, including the Cannes Film Festival (Un Certain Regard), the Moscow Film Festival and San Sebastian. The Moving Picture Man is one of the most recognised Venezuelan films.

Years later Roche released The Secret (El secreto) (1988), a thriller where he made as well his second role as actor. In 1996,  directed Out In The Open (Aire Libre), a film co-wrote with Jacques Espagne. In this movie, Roche played the character of Siefert. Out In The Open was based on the scientific trip to equatorial lands of Alexander von Humboldt and Aimé Bonpland and was awarded in different Cinema festivals. In 2003, Roche directed Yotama Goes Flying (2003) (Yotama se va volando), a film wrote with Carlos Brito and Jacques Espagne. In 2011, he wrote and directed Suddenly, A Film (2011) (De repente, La película), a satirical and improvised comedy with Daniela Bascope and Carlos Antonio León as two lovers who try to shoot a movie in the Venezuelan jungle with disastrous results. In this film, Roche also played three characters and composed several musical pieces.

Filmography 

{| class="wikitable"
|-
! Year !! Movie !! Role
|-
|rowspan="3"| 2011
|Los Pacheco, A Salsa Family (documentary short)
| Director, Screenwriter
|-
|Suddenly, A Film (fiction feature length)
| Director, Screenwriter, Actor, Composer
|-
|My Brother Marcel Roche (documentary)
| Director, Screenwriter
|-
|rowspan="2"| 2003
| Cosmic Opera (cortometraje)
| Director, Screenwriter, Adaptation
|-
|Yotama Goes Flying (fiction feature length) 
|Director, Screenwriter
|-
|rowspan="1"| 2001
|Bach in Zaraza (documentary)
| Director, Screenwriter
|-
|rowspan="1"| 2000
|Virtuosos (short)
| Director, Screenwriter, Cinematography, Sound
|-
|rowspan="1"| 1996
|Out in the Open (en) / Le Passage des hommes libres (fr) (fiction feature length)| Director, co-writer, Producer
|-
|rowspan="1"| 1998
|El secreto (largometraje ficción)| Director
|-
|rowspan="1"| 1977
|The Moving Picture Man (fiction feature length)| Director, Screenwriter
|-
|rowspan="1"| 1975
|Like Islands in Time (short)| Director, Screenwriter
|-
|rowspan="1"| 1974
|Una singular posta científica (short)| Director, Screenwriter
|-
|rowspan="2"| 1972
|Mérida Is Not A Town (short)| Director, Screenwriter, Producer
|-
|El indio Figueredo (short)| Director, Screenwriter
|-
|rowspan="1"| 1971
|Carlos Cruz Diez, 1923-1977. On The Road To Color (documentary short)| Director, Screenwriter, Sound
|-
|rowspan="1"| 1969
|La bulla del diamante (short)| Director, Screenwriter, Cinematography
|-
|rowspan="2"| 1968
|Drums From San Juan (documentary short)| Director, Screenwriter
|-
|Víctor Millán (documentary short)| Director, Screenwriter, Production, Cinematography, Sound
|-
|rowspan="2"| 1966
|Los locos de San Miguel (documentary short)| Director, Screenwriter, Cinematography
|-
|La fiesta de la virgen de La Candelaria (documentary short)| Director, Screenwriter, Cinematography, Camera Operator
|-
|rowspan="1"| 1964
|Raymond Isidore and His House (documentary short)| Director, Screenwriter
|-
|rowspan="2"| 1963
|Vamos a ver dijo un ciego a su esposa sorda (short)| Director, Screenwriter
|-
|Gennevilliers, puerto de París (short)| Director, Screenwriter
|-
|}

References

Bibliography
 ARMAS, Ricardo; MARQUEZ, Manuel. Luis Armando Roche, Cine a través del espejo. Caracas, Comala.com, 2004. 
 LOZADA, Carolina. Luis Armando Roche (Cuadernos cineastas venezolanos). Caracas, Fundación Cinemateca Nacional, 2008. 
 ROCHE, Luis Armando. Asómate, hacia adentro. Charleston SC, 2010. 

 External links 
 
  Official website of ARSIETE C.A.
  Official Web Site Suddenly, the movie''
  Artícle in Estampas Magazine about Yotama
  Suddenly, The Movie We Are Movie Geeks Movie Reviews
 Luis Roche.

1938 births
Living people
Venezuelan film directors
People from Caracas
Tulane University alumni